Eupithecia amasina is a moth in the family Geometridae first described by Otto Bohatsch in 1893. It is found in Russia Turkey, Lebanon and Syria.

References

Moths described in 1893
amasina
Moths of Asia
Moths of Europe